Ebbw Vale was a constituency in the Parliament of the United Kingdom. It was created for the 1918 general election and returned one Member of Parliament (MP) by the first past the post system until it was abolished for the 1983 general election.

Boundaries 
The constituency was first contested in 1918 and was used until 1983. It comprised the north-western part of the historic county of Monmouthshire, in south-east Wales.

The seat was a county constituency, formed as a division of Monmouthshire. The areas, which comprised the seat, were Ebbw Vale, Rhymney and Tredegar. The division included three Urban District council areas, one named after each town. The boundaries were left unchanged throughout the existence of the Ebbw Vale constituency.

Members of Parliament

Elections

Election in the 1970s

Elections in the 1960s

Elections in the 1950s

Elections in the 1940s

Election in the 1930s

Election in the 1920s

Election in the 1910s

References
 Boundaries of Parliamentary Constituencies 1885-1972, compiled and edited by F. W. S. Craig (Political Reference Publications, 1972) 
 British Parliamentary Election Results 1918-1949, compiled and edited  by F.W.S. Craig (The Macmillan Press, revised edition, 1977) 
 British Parliamentary Election Results 1950-1973, compiled and edited  by F.W.S. Craig (Parliamentary Research Services, 2nd edition, 1983) 
 British Parliamentary Election Results 1974-1983, compiled and edited  by F.W.S. Craig (Parliamentary Research Services 1984) 

Historic parliamentary constituencies in South Wales
Constituencies of the Parliament of the United Kingdom established in 1918
Constituencies of the Parliament of the United Kingdom disestablished in 1983
Blaenau Gwent